Romanian composer, producer and DJ Alexandru Cotoi has written songs for various artists, mostly Romanian. He has written songs under his full name or a shorter version of his first name, Alex Cotoi, and has released music under the pseudonym Sickotoy. Cotoi published his first songs in 2003. In October 2007, while being part of Morandi, he formed the music group Sonichouse alongside Radu Dumitriu, Răzvan Gorcinski, and Victor Bourosu. By September 2009, the group had published five songs on their Myspace profile and announced that they were working on their debut album, which was released on 16 April 2011, titled Supersonic.

During his career, Cotoi has accrued several notable writing credits. He co-wrote nine tracks on Alexandra Stan's 2014 studio album Unlocked, including the singles "Dance", "Thanks for Leaving" and "Vanilla Chocolat". In 2015, he contributed to "Baddest Girl in Town" which appears on Pitbull's ninth studio album Dale. Aside from the single "Sub pielea mea", which peaked at number one in the Commonwealth of Independent States, Romania, and Russia, Cotoi co-wrote three other tracks on Carla's Dreams's debut album Ngoc. He contributed to the group's second album Antiexemplu, writing each track alongside them. Cotoi was also heavily involved in the songwriting process for Irina Rimes's Cosmos and Delia's 7, respectively. In 2019, under the pseudonym Sickotoy, he released his debut single "Addicted" featuring Minelli. The song peaked at number two in Romania. His next single, "You Don't Love Me" featuring Roxen, attained similar success, peaking at number three in Romania and at number seven in Bulgaria.

In 2020, as part of a collaboration with TVR, Global Records was tasked with selecting the Romanian entry for the 65th edition of the Eurovision Song Contest. Cotoi was one of the songwriters involved, having co-written two of the five songs that were chosen for the national final, those being "Beautiful Disaster" and "Colors". In the same year, he collaborated with Inna on her seventh studio album, Heartbreaker, having a writing credit on each track. The album's lead single, "Flashbacks", peaked at number four in Romania, reached number one in Russia and was the most played song in 2021 in the former according to Media Forest. The two collaborated again in 2021 for Inna's eighth studio album, Champagne Problems, which was released in 2022. Another 2021 collaboration of theirs was the non-album single "Up", which peaked at number one in Romania. Other writing credits which topped the Romanian music charts include Minelli's "Mariola", "Insula" by The Motans and Emaa, and Iuliana Beregoi's "Cum sună liniștea".

Songs

Notes

References

Cotoi, Alexandru, List of songs written by